Ringgold may refer to:

Places

United States
 Ringgold, Georgia, named after the soldier Samuel Ringgold
 Ringgold County, Iowa, named after the soldier Samuel Ringgold
 Ringgold, Kentucky, an unincorporated community
 Ringgold, Louisiana, named after the soldier Samuel Ringgold
 Ringgold, Maryland
 Ringgold, Nebraska
 Ringgold, Ohio
 Ringgold Township, Jefferson County, Pennsylvania, named after the soldier Samuel Ringgold
 Ringgold, Pennsylvania
 New Ringgold, Pennsylvania
 Ringgold, Texas, named after the family of the founder's wife
 Ringgold, Virginia
 Ringgold, West Virginia
 Ringold Formation, Washington state geologic formation

Fiji
 Ringgold Isles

People
 Cadwalader Ringgold (1802–1867), American naval officer, son of Samuel Ringgold, brother of the soldier Samuel Ringgold
 Faith Ringgold (born 1930), African-American artist
 Samuel Ringgold (congressman) (1770–1829), Maryland congressman, soldier in the American Revolutionary War and War of 1812, father of Cadwalader Ringgold and the soldier Samuel Ringgold
 Samuel Ringgold (United States Army officer) (1796–1846), hero of Battle of Palo Alto in the Mexican–American War, after whom numerous communities are named; son of Samuel Ringgold, brother of Cadwalader Ringgold
 Tench Ringgold, 19th-century American businessman and political appointee

Also:
 Ring Lardner (1885–1933), full name Ringgold Wilmer Lardner, American writer

Other uses
 Ringgold High School (Pennsylvania), Monongahela, Pennsylvania
 Ringgold identifier, a unique identifier for organisations in the publishing industry supply chain
 USS Ringgold (DD-89), named after Cadwalader Ringgold
 USS Ringgold (DD-500), named after Cadwalader Ringgold
 Battle of Ringgold Gap, in the American Civil War